The 2011–12 season was St Mirren's sixth consecutive season in the Scottish Premier League, having competed in the league since their promotion in the 2005–06 season. St Mirren also competed in the League Cup and the Scottish Cup.

Summary
St Mirren finished eight in the Scottish Premier League. They reached the quarter-finals of the Scottish Cup where they were beaten by eventual winners Hearts. They also reached the League Cup quarter-finals but were beaten by lower league opposition Ayr United.

Matches

Friendlies

Scottish Premier League

Scottish Cup

Scottish League Cup

Squad information

Captains

Players
Last updated 13 May 2012

|}

Disciplinary record
Includes all competitive matches.
Last updated 13 May 2012

Top scorer
Last updated on 13 May 2012

Team statistics

League table

Transfers

Players in

Players out

See also
List of St Mirren F.C. seasons

References 

St Mirren F.C. seasons
St Mirren